Below are the squads for the 1938 FIFA World Cup final tournament in France.

Hungary and Switzerland were the only teams who had players from foreign clubs. All the three such players represented French clubs.

Nine selected players by Germany came from the qualified but not participating Austria due to Anschluss.

Rosters include reserves, alternates, and preselected players that may have participated in qualifiers and/or pre-tournament friendlies but not in the finals themselves.

Italy
Head coach: Vittorio Pozzo

Hungary
Head coach: Károly Dietz and Alfréd Schaffer

Brazil
Head coach: Adhemar Pimenta

Sweden
Head coach:  József Nagy

Czechoslovakia
Head coach: Josef Meissner

Switzerland
Head coach:  Karl Rappan

Cuba
Head coach: José Tapia

France
Head coach: Gaston Barreau

Romania
Head coach: Alexandru Săvulescu and Costel Rădulescu

Germany
Head coach: Sepp Herberger

Poland
Head coach: Józef Kałuża

Norway
Head coach: Asbjørn Halvorsen

Belgium
Head coach:  Jack Butler

Netherlands
Head coach:  Bob Glendenning

Dutch East Indies
Head coach:  Johan Mastenbroek

References

External links
  1938 FIFA World Cup squads at Weltfussball.de

Squads
FIFA World Cup squads